Mehlingen is a municipality in the district of Kaiserslautern, in Rhineland-Palatinate, western Germany.

It is located  outside Kaiserslautern and has a population of just under 4,000.

The village is greatly influenced by the large number of Americans stationed in the area, often called the Kaiserslautern Military Community.

References

Municipalities in Rhineland-Palatinate
Palatinate Forest
Kaiserslautern (district)